Nancy Guadalupe Antonio López (born 2 April 1996) is a Mexican professional football midfielder who plays for UANL of the Liga MX Femenil.

Career
She played for the Mexico national team at the 2015 Pan American Games. She scored a goal for Mexico in a 3–2 loss to Canada in a 2017 friendly. She also played for Mexico in a 2017 friendly against Sweden.

Honours

Club
UANL
Liga MX Femenil: Clausura 2018
Liga MX Femenil: Clausura 2019

References

External links
 
 

1996 births
Living people
Women's association football midfielders
Mexican women's footballers
Footballers from Mexico City
Mexico women's international footballers
Pan American Games competitors for Mexico
Footballers at the 2015 Pan American Games
Footballers at the 2019 Pan American Games
Liga MX Femenil players
Tigres UANL (women) footballers
Pan American Games bronze medalists for Mexico
Pan American Games medalists in football
Medalists at the 2015 Pan American Games
21st-century Mexican women
20th-century Mexican women
Mexican footballers